Radisson Blu Edwardian, Heathrow is a luxury hotel in west London, England. It is located at 140 Bath Road in Hayes, London Borough of Hillingdon, in close proximity to Heathrow Airport.

History
The hotel opened in 1960 and was originally called the Skyway Hotel. It was purchased in 1989 by Edwardian Hotels, refurbished and renamed the Edwardian International. In 1990, it became the Radisson Edwardian Heathrow hotel and later the Radisson Blu Edwardian, Heathrow. Edwardian Hotels Group considers the hotel to be its flagship property.

Style and facilities

According to Frommer's, the hotel is decorated in the Edwardian style with Persian rugs, brass-railed staircases, chandeliers and hand-painted hardwood furnishings. The bathrooms are marble in each of the 459 rooms. The hotel has 294 standard rooms, 17 suites, 101 deluxe rooms, and 47 single rooms.

The hotel has three restaurants and bars, the Annayu Restaurant, which offers a blend of classic and contemporary Indian cuisine, the Steak & Lobster Restaurant, and the Bijou Lounge Bar.

The hotel contains the Pegasus Health Spa and Gym which also caters in beauty treatments and contains a dance studio. The hotel also has a jewellers store and a newsagents.

Radisson Blu Edwardian Heathrow Hotel also functions as a noted conference centre, and regularly hosts exhibitions, conventions, press conferences and weddings. It has 43 rooms allocated to this purpose, the largest of which has a capacity for 500 guests. On March 25–27, 2005 it hosted a Dawn of the Dead convention. On March 21–24, 2008 it hosted the Science Fiction Easter Convention.

Reception
In 2010, Business Traveller magazine voted it the best airport hotel in the world.

References

External links

 
 

Hotels in London
Radisson Blu
Buildings and structures in the London Borough of Hillingdon
Hotel buildings completed in 1960